Loca or LOCA may refer to:

Arts and entertainment
 La Loca, Latin American female mythotype
 La Loca (opera), by Gian Carlo Menotti

Music
 Loca Records, an independent UK record label
 Loca (EP), an EP by Tomomi Itano

Songs
 "Loca" (Álvaro Soler song), 2019
 "Loca" (Arsenium and Natalia Gordienko song), a 2007 Eurovision song
 "Loca" (Dana International song), 2013
 "Loca" (Shakira song), 2010, based on "Loca Con Su Tiguere" by El Cata
 Loca (Honey Singh song), 2020
 Loca (Khea song), 2017
 "Loca", a 2009 song by Aleks Syntek from Métodos de Placer Instantáneo
 "Loca", a 1997 song by Alejandra Guzmán from La Guzmán
 "Loca", a 2017 song by Maite Perroni
 "Loca", a 2012 song by Mariana Seoane from La Malquerida
 "La Loca", a 1993 song by grupera music group Los Fugitivos

Other uses
 Lodi AVA (LoCA), an American Viticultural Area in the Central Valley of California
 Liquid optically clear adhesive, an adhesive used in display devices
 Loss-of-coolant accident, an accident scenario in nuclear reactors

See also
 Loka (disambiguation)